Dot & Effects was a visual effect, animation and production studio based in Temecula, California. 

It won Katy Perry the Best Video Special Effects Award at the 2011 MTV Video Music Awards. The video E.T. featured Kanye West.

References

External links 
 http://andeffects.com

See also
 MTV Video Music Award for Best Special Effects

Visual effects companies
Companies based in California
Temecula, California
American animation studios